Laura Adrienne Townsend MacDonald (April 16, 1887 – April 1982) was an American pianist and a business pioneer woman.

Early life
Laura Adrienne Townsend was born in Park City, Utah, on April 16, 1887, the daughter of Herbert Scott and Elizabeth A. Townsend.

Career
Laura Adrienne MacDonald was a pianist. She was the church organist at Tonopah, Nevada.

After moving to La Crescenta from Tonopah, she started a real estate business with the development of 50 acres in Highway Highlands, California. At the death of her husband in 1933, the Foothill Boulevard office had grown to include insurance and notary services. She ran the business alone for the next 36 years retiring in 1969 at 82 years old.

She was the president of Tonopah Woman's Club and of La Crescenta Woman's Club.

She was the president of the Tonopah Parent-Teacher Association and member of the Lincoln Parent-Teacher Association.

She was a member of the American Red Cross and the Board of Realtors. In 1968 she was honored by the La Crescenta Chamber of Commerce as the La Crescentan of the year.

During World War II, she worked the swing shift as a riveter for Lockheed Aircraft Co. after putting in a full day at her own office.

Personal life
In 1910 in Detroit, Laura Adrienne Townsend married Rory Q. MacDonald (died in 1933) and had five children: Jack H., Gordon, Bruce, Scott T. and Roderick Q.. From Nevada, they moved to California in 1923 and lived at Highway Highlands, La Crescenta, California.

She died in April 1982.

References

1887 births
1982 deaths
American women classical pianists
American classical pianists
American classical organists
People from Park City, Utah